St Joseph's Roman Catholic Church is on Conway Road, Colwyn Bay, in Conwy County Borough, Wales. The Roman Catholic parish church of Colwyn Bay, it is part of the Diocese of Wrexham.

History 
St Joseph's Church was designed by R. Curran; building began in 1898 and was completed in 1900. Monsignor James Lennon of Lancashire donated the money to build the church, in memory of his brother, Dean John Lennon.

School
St Joseph's Catholic Primary School is a voluntary aided school in the grounds of the church on Brackley Avenue. The school opened in 1933 and the current head teacher is Mr J. Wilkinson.

See also

References 

1900 establishments in Wales
Churches in Conwy County Borough
Roman Catholic churches in Wales
Roman Catholic Diocese of Wrexham
Missionary Oblates of Mary Immaculate churches in the United Kingdom